Esperanto culture refers to the shared cultural experience of the Esperantujo, or Esperanto-speaking community. Despite being a constructed language, Esperanto has a history dating back to the late 19th century, and shared socio-cultural norms have developed among its speakers. Some of these can be traced back to the initial ideas of the language's creator, Ludwig Zamenhof, including the theory that a global second language would foster international communication. Others have developed over time, as the language has allowed different national and linguistic cultures to blend together. Some Esperanto speakers have also researched the language's ideologies.

Esperanto culture also includes art, literature, and music, as well as international celebrations and cultural exchanges such as the Pasporta Servo.

Native speakers 

Native Esperanto speakers are people who have acquired Esperanto as one of their native languages.  As of 1996, there were 350 or so attested cases of families with native Esperanto speakers. Estimates from associations indicate that there are currently around 1,000 Esperanto-speaking families, involving perhaps 2,000 children.  In all known cases, speakers are natively multilingual, being raised in both Esperanto and either the local national language or the native language of their parents. In all but a handful of cases, it was the father who used Esperanto with the child. In the majority of such families, the parents had the same native language, though in many the parents had different native languages, and only Esperanto in common.

Writing

Esperanto was originally a language that one had to learn entirely through books, and even today most people live apart from each other and converse through the internet, so writing and reading are a big part of Esperanto culture. Most people have created or translated some sort of written work whether fiction or nonfiction, published or available to read online for free.

Penpals have been popular since Esperanto's earliest days, as Esperanto was originally advertised as a language where you could "send a letter with a message, short list of grammar rules and a dictionary to a complete stranger, and they'll be able to look up the words and write a coherent reply back". Many people did indeed do this in order to recruit more Esperanto speakers.

At the time, in the early 1900s, there was no major world language that could be used "anywhere" and it was difficult to get accurate information about foreign countries. On top of that, things like stamp collecting were popular hobbies for children. In the modern day, most Esperanto speakers talk to each other through the internet.

Monato ("month") is a general news magazine "like a genuinely international Time or Newsweek", written by local correspondents.

A magazine for the blind, Aŭroro, has been published since 1920 and in general, Esperanto hosts the largest Braille publications in the world — starting in the early 1900s Esperanto was taught in schools of the blind in Europe, and that is where the trend started.

Esperanto is the magazine used by the World Esperanto Association to inform its members about everything happening in the Esperanto community.

There are many more magazines created by individual Esperanto clubs from towns in places such as from Japan and China.

Literature

Books that are translated to Esperanto are not always internationally famous books, because everyone can already read those in another language that they know. For example, several Japanese crime novels and several Icelandic novels that have never been translated to English (or any other language) have been translated to Esperanto. One reason for this is that people are actually translating their favourite stories instead of famous ones, and another is that it's simply cheaper and easier to get the rights to translate a small-time book compared to a famous one.

The first Harry Potter book, for example, was translated and the translator enquired about how to purchase translating rights so the book could be published, but J.K. Rowling refused to allow it to be published in Esperanto (despite Harry Potter and the Philosopher's Stone being one of the most-translated books in the whole world). In lieu of physical books, the translation now exists as a free download on the internet.

Similarly, famous books translated into Esperanto are often books fallen into public domain such as the Bible, the Quran, or works by Shakespeare, Molière, Balzac, etc., because there are no rights on them.

Esperanto literature and organisations such as the Universal Esperanto Association (Sennacieca Asocio Tutmonda or SAT) often advocated against nationalism, leading to several fascist governments attempting to ban and eradicate its usage: Germany, Francoist Spain, Portugal, as well as in the Soviet Union. However, the level to which this discrimination was due to association with Judaism and Jewish people cannot be fully known; Hitler wrote of it as intrinsically Jewish and called it a "Jewish weapon" in his Mein Kampf. Following this history of suppression, Esperanto literature frequently concerns themes of resistance and anti-nationalism, though not all criticism of Esperanto is grounded in politics (See Esperanto#Criticism).

There are over 25,000 Esperanto books (originals and translations) as well as over a hundred regularly distributed Esperanto magazines. This is despite that Esperanto has only existed for around 100 years. In comparison, the entire literature of Iceland (a country created in the 900s, and with a population of around 320,000 people) totals fewer than 50,000 books.

Media
Esperanto music is usually done in the traditional style of a person's country, but "international" music (American pop music, rap music etc.) also exists. Many famous songs are translated to Esperanto as well, for example "La vie en rose" and "En el frente de Gandesa" (the links are to the Esperanto versions of the songs on YouTube).

There are currently radio broadcasts from China Radio International, Melbourne Ethnic Community Radio, Radio Habana Cuba, Radio Audizioni Italiane (Rai), Radio Polonia, Radio F.R.E.I. and Radio Vatican. Many more people have personal podcasts and vlogs.

In 1964, Jacques-Louis Mahé produced the first full-length feature film in Esperanto, entitled Angoroj. This was followed in 1965 by the first American Esperanto-production: Incubus, starring William Shatner. Incubus however is commonly seen as a funny way of introducing a person to Esperanto, as none of the actors even knew how to pronounce Esperanto in the first place, the dialogue being strange and bad due to the scriptwriter not getting a second opinion before the filming was done, and the plot being confusing in general.

Internacia Televido, an internet television channel, began broadcasting in November 2005. Australia is the hotspot of much of the organization behind Esperanto television.
Several short films have been produced, and at times plays have been recorded "for television". , the Esperanto-language Wikipedia lists 14 films and 3 short films.

In 2011, Academy Award-nominated director Sam Green (The Weather Underground), released a new documentary about Esperanto titled The Universal Language (La Universala Lingvo.) This 30-minute film traces the history of Esperanto. It's known for having extremely good camera quality and filming sense, as well as being a good "absolute introduction" to what Esperanto is, but is criticized for being too short.

Many more films, cartoons and documentaries that aren't Esperanto originals are simply subtitled in Esperanto and put up on YouTube. Some fan-dubs exist, especially of Disney songs and short scenes.

Conventions
Many people wear their country's traditional clothing to Esperanto conventions, whether or not they would ever wear it in their own country. Swedish people, for example, who usually never wear their traditional clothing in their own country, may still wear traditional clothing for any meeting involving Esperanto speakers.

Every year, the World Congress of Esperanto, which is held in different countries around the world according to year (though it mostly takes place in Europe). Each convention draws in an average of 1500–3000 attendees, and the best-attended conferences are those held in Central or Eastern Europe (generally meaning Poland, Hungary etc.), as Esperanto is an option for fulfilling mandatory foreign-language requirements in Hungarian schools, and the creator of Esperanto came from Poland (see statistics at World Congress of Esperanto).

Gufujo

Esperanto speakers create a makeshift café (whether in a rented space or someone's home), using Esperanto coins or voucher-like items as well as real money to pay for food and drink. Live music, poetry reading, or literature reading are usual activities. This custom arose in 1995 in order to contrast with the more usual custom of after-convention partying at a bar.

Pasporta Servo

An organisation called Pasporta Servo offers a free couchsurfing and homestay service, enabling cheaper and easier travel through a shared language.

Food
As Esperanto speakers are from all over the world, and families whose children speak Esperanto natively usually have parents from two vastly different countries, recipes incorporating elements from different countries are naturally born. Traditional foods are also enjoyed in settings where a native wouldn't normally mix or eat them.

One cookbook is Internacie kuiri “Cooking Internationally” by Maria Becker-Meisberger, published by FEL (Flemish Esperanto League), Antwerp 1989, . Another is Manĝoj el sanigaj plantoj  “Meals from Healthy Vegetable Dishes” by Zlata Nanić, published by BIO-ZRNO, Zagreb 2002, .

Some Esperanto periodicals, such as MONATO, include recipes from time to time.

Zamenhof Day

On December 15 (L. L. Zamenhof's birthday), Esperanto speakers around the world celebrate Zamenhof Day, sometimes called Book Day. It's a common goal to have a book written in Esperanto published on or by that day, as Zamenhof was a strong advocate of the idea that in order to spread Esperanto around the world, its speakers need to create a large body of literature.

The poem La Espero is the Esperanto anthem, and most Esperanto speakers know the lyrics of the anthem by heart. It is often sung at conventions. Whether or not one enjoys the lyrics, the song is something that ties all Esperanto speakers together — as it has been around since Esperanto's early days. The tune of La Espero is known to most Esperanto speakers, and is a general tradition. The very short poem Ho, mia kor' (Zamenhof, 1887) and the longer  (Zamenhof, 1896) are also very famous and often quoted in whole or in part; some distychs of La vojo, in particular, have become proverbial (e.g. Eĉ guto malgranda, konstante frapante, traboros la monton granitan “Even a small drop, by constantly hitting, will pierce the mountain of granite” as a metaphor for unyielding perseverance).

Religion
Esperanto has had an influence on certain religious traditions (Oomoto, Baháʼí Faith, etc., see Esperanto and religion). While some Esperantists subscribe to these beliefs, they are not necessarily common, and are neither required nor encouraged by any Esperanto groups.

See also
 Gufujo
 Esperanto literature
 Esperanto music
 Esperanto flag
 Interhelpo
 Zamenhof-Esperanto object'
 Esperanto profanity

Notes

References

External links
Esperanto Kaj Turismo
Esperanto-USA's Esperanto Day page
Jacques-Louis Mahé
Generator for Esperanto typographical filler text
esperanto-panorama.net: Radio in Esperanto
Melbourne Ethnic Community Radio program with Esperanto entry
Radio F.R.E.I. from Erfurt/Germany once a month
Propono por la tago de Esperanto-libro kaj Zamenhof-festo
Esperanto website from Spain
Esperanto version of Le Monde diplomatique